In finance, indifference pricing is a method of pricing financial securities with regard to a utility function.  The  indifference price is also known as the reservation price or private valuation.  In particular, the indifference price is the price at which an agent would have the same expected utility level by exercising a financial transaction as by not doing so (with optimal trading otherwise).  Typically the indifference price is a pricing range (a bid–ask spread) for a specific agent; this price range is an example of good-deal bounds.

Mathematics
Given a utility function  and a claim  with known payoffs at some terminal time  let the function  be defined by
 ,
The indifference price bound is the range .

Example
To find either the bid or ask indifference price for a single European call option with strike 110, first calculate .

 
 .
Which is maximized when , therefore .

Now to find the indifference bid price solve for 

 
 
Which is maximized when , therefore .

Therefore  when .

See also
Willingness to pay
Willingness to accept

Notes
 If  are the indifference price bounds for a claim then by definition .
Therefore, in a complete market the indifference price is always equal to the price to hedge the claim.

References

Mathematical finance
Utility
Pricing